Karl Wittig (11 November 1890 – 4 September 1958) was a German racing cyclist. He won the German National Road Race in 1910.

References

External links

1890 births
1958 deaths
German male cyclists
Cyclists from Berlin
German cycling road race champions
20th-century German people